Svarvarnuten is a mountain in the municipality of Valle in Agder county, Norway.

See also
List of mountains of Norway

References

Mountains of Agder
Valle, Norway